Castledermot Round Tower is a 10th-century round tower in Castledermot, County Kildare, Ireland. The tower, and the high crosses nearby, are a National Monument.

Building
The tower is complete, although the original cap has been replaced with battlements. It is composed of rounded granite boulders embedded in mortar.

History
Castledermot was founded as a monastic settlement c. 800 AD. The bishop-poet Cormac mac Cuilennáin was buried here in AD 938 and the round tower was probably built around that time. The community ceased to exist some time after 1073.

The crosses

There are two high crosses:
The north cross depicts David, the Binding of Isaac and the miracles of Jesus.
The south cross depicts the Arrest of Jesus, Daniel, and Adam and Eve.

References

National Monuments in County Kildare
Religion in County Kildare
Towers in the Republic of Ireland